Vadim Viktorovich Gerasimov (born 15 June 1969) is an engineer at Google. From 1994 to 2003, Vadim worked and studied at the MIT Media Lab. Vadim earned a BS/MS in applied mathematics from Moscow State University in 1992 and a Ph.D. from MIT in 2003.

At age 16 he was one of the original co-developers of the famous video game Tetris: he ported Alexey Pajitnov's original game to the IBM PC architecture and the two later added features to the game.

References

External links
Vadim Gerasimov personal webpage

Russian video game designers
Video game designers
Russian computer programmers
Russian inventors
Google employees
Moscow State University alumni
Living people
1969 births